Uyirukku Uyiraga is a 2014 Indian Tamil-language film directed by Vijaya Manojkumar and produced by Kovaithambi. The film stars Sanjeev, Sharan, Preethi Das and Nandhana.

Cast 
 Sanjeev as Suriya
 Sharran as Karthik
 Preethi Das as Pinky
 Nandhana as Priya
 Prabhu as Rangasamy
 Sriranjani as Lakshmi
 Sathish as Karthik's friend

Production 
Uyirukku Uyiraga is the 25th film of Manoj Kumar and marks his return to directing after a sabbatical; with this film, he renamed himself Vijaya Manojkumar. It also marks the return of Kovaithambi to producing since Chembaruthi (1992); previously he launched a film named Yen Ippadi Mayakinay in 2008, which never released. The film, produced by Vendhar Productions, has cinematography by Anand Kumar. Punjabi woman Preethi Das plays a college girl in the film.

Themes 
Manojkumar stated that the theme of the film is education, and the "relationship between a father and his son. Many parents, fathers especially, think that their responsibility towards their children ends with providing them with good education and helping them settle in their chosen career. They feign indifference, or completely oppose it, when their kids fall in love. This film is all about how a father must help his kid if he's taken a wrong step in romance."

Soundtrack 
The soundtrack was composed by Santha Kumar. "Venum Venum", a gaana song written by Manojkumar, is sung by Velmurugan and Chinnaponnu. "Enakku Theriyamal" and "Kaaichal" are "romantic melodies". The Holi-themed "Jhoom Le", written by Snehan, includes Hindi lyrics, given its Uttaranchal setting. A song written by Gana Bala and sung by Sharran and Madhu was planned to be included in the film.

Reception 
Anupama Subramanian of Deccan Chronicle wrote, "Vijaya Manojumar is back after a gap wielding megaphone. Though he tries to impart a good message, the incoherent screenplay plays the spoilsport. While the first half is bland, post interval it picks up momentum." Maalai Malar too criticised the first half and said the second half was better, praised the music and Anand Kumar's cinematography, but concluded that the film overall lacked life.

References 

2010s Tamil-language films